The Admiralty Constabulary was a police force in the United Kingdom formed under the Special Constables Act 1923 which existed from 1949 to 1971.

History
The constabulary can trace its history back to 1686 when the Royal Navy needed an organisation to prevent dockyard crime. So the Secretary to the Admiralty – Samuel Pepys, the diarist – formed a force of 'porters, rounders, warders and watchmen' to guard the naval yards. Porters identified and escorted visitors, rounders patrolled the yard, warders were responsible for the keys and backed up the porters at the gates, and the part-time watchmen guarded buildings and areas by night.

In 1834 this force became the first dockyard police, with full police powers within the dockyards, and acting as policemen over offences committed by employees and naval personnel within a radius of five miles of the yard. Rewards for obtaining convictions quickly led to corruption, so the force was 'cleaned up' and then abolished. In 1860 dockyard divisions of the Metropolitan Police took over and senior naval officers became magistrates. From 1923 onwards the Metropolitan Police presence began to be replaced by Royal Marines appointed as special constables under the Special Constables Act 1923. No. 3 (Devonport) Division was the last of these six divisions to be pulled out, leaving in 1934, the year which also saw the formal formation of the Royal Marine Police.

By 1945 the Admiralty's Chief Constable headed not only the Royal Marine Police, but also the Royal Marine Police Special Reserve and in naval hospitals the Admiralty Civil Police. All three of these forces were merged on 1 October 1949 to form a new Admiralty Constabulary. That Admiralty Constabulary was in turn amalgamated with the Army Department Constabulary and the Air Force Department Constabulary in 1971 to form the Ministry of Defence Police.

See also
Law enforcement in the United Kingdom
List of defunct law enforcement agencies in the United Kingdom
Department of Defense Police

Notes

Sources
  Button, Mark (2012). Private Policing. Oxford, England: Routledge. .
Focus on the Ministry of Defence Police (MDP), QuestOnline
 Hind, Bob (24 April 2016). "In days when the Admiralty ran its own police force". The News.
 Ministry of Defence Police Bill [Lords] (Hansard, 27 January 1987)". hansard.millbanksystems.com. Hansard, vol 109 cc276-85. Retrieved 13 March 2018.

External links

Royal Navy
Admiralty departments
Defunct police forces of the United Kingdom
Ministry of Defence Police
1949 establishments in the United Kingdom
1971 disestablishments in the United Kingdom
Civilian police forces of defense ministries